765 Naval Air Squadron (765 NAS) was a Naval Air Squadron of the Royal Navy's Fleet Air Arm. It formed at RNAS Lee-on-Solent, in May 1939, as a Seaplane School and Pool squadron. The squadron moved to RNAS Sandbanks, in August 1940, where it undertook the Seaplane Flying Training Course Part I. Lieutenant Commander Wilson was appointed as dual officer in charge of the air base, and Commanding officer of 765 NAS. By the middle of 1943, dedicated Seaplane Training schools ended and the squadron disbanded in the October. 765 NAS reformed at RNAS Charlton Horethorne, in early February 1944, as a Travelling Recording Unit. The squadron moved to RNAS Lee-on-Solent in March, before moving to RNAS Worthy Down on one month later during April, then in May it moved to RNAS Stretton, were it remained during June.

The squadron returned to RNAS Lee-on-Solent at the start of August 1944, it was equipped with Wellington aircraft, which were fitted with radar and used to record the effectiveness of other radar units. It moved to RNAS Twatt in September, operating there until the November, when it flew to RAF Eastchurch and then onto RAF Hornchurch. The squadron provided naval co-operation in liaison with No. 567 Squadron, an anti-aircraft co-operation squadron of the Royal Air Force; after the end of World War II, the squadron moved to RAF Manston, in June 1945. 765 NAS's next move was to Malta, in the October, based at RNAS Hal Far, it provided air transport for personnel, stationed within the Mediterranean Rim, to return home, via Malta. It disbanded at Hal Far in April 1946.

765 Naval Air Squadron reformed for the third time, in May 1955, at RNAS Culdrose, as a Piston Engine Pilot Pool and it also provided refresher flying for Fleet Air Arm pilots. For almost two years, it trained over two hundred pilots, on either Firefly or Oxford aircraft, with the squadron disbanding, at Culdrose, in March 1957.

History of 765 NAS

Basic Seaplane Training and Pool Squadron (1939 - 1943) 

765 Naval Air Squadron formed at RNAS Lee-on-Solent (HMS Daedalus), situated near Lee-on-the-Solent in Hampshire, on the 24 May 1939, as a Basic Seaplane Training and Pool Squadron. It was initially equipped with Walrus amphibian aircraft and, Seafox and Swordfish Seaplane aircraft. The squadron trained pilots in operating seaplane aircraft and provided a pilot reserve for Fleet Air Arm catapult squadrons. In February 1940, 765 NAS received two Blackburn Roc aircraft, fitted with floats, for evaluation.

On the 26 August 1940, the squadron moved to RNAS Sandbanks, located on the premises of the Royal Motor Yacht Club (RMYC) at Sandbanks, Poole Harbour, Dorset, which had been requisitioned as a Seaplane base by the Admiralty, taking its collection of Walrus amphibious aircraft, and Swordfish, Seafox and Roc floatplane aircraft. Here it had a new role, providing the Seaplane Flying Training Course Part I, of the basic Seaplane training. In June 1941 both the Swordfish and Roc aircraft were withdrawn from squadron use; The Seafox aircraft were withdrawn one year later, in June 1942, however, at the same time, United States built Vought Kingfisher seaplane aircraft arrived. By mid 1943, the need for dedicated Seaplane Training squadrons had passed and on the 25 October 1943, 765 NAS disbanded.

Travelling Recording Unit (1944 - 1945) 

765 Naval Air Squadron reformed, on the 10 February 1944, at RNAS Charlton Horethorne (HMS Heron II), situated in the hamlet of Sigwells in Somerset, England, as a Travelling Recording Unit. The squadron briefly moved to RNAS Lee-on-Solent (HMS Daedalus), on the 18 March 1944. However, at the beginning of August, the squadron returned to RNAS Lee-on-Solent.

In the same month, the squadron was equipped with Wellington aircraft. It received three Wellington GR Mark XI, maritime reconnaissance aircraft. They were ex-RAF Coastal Command and were fitted with ASV Mark II radar. A fourth Wellington aircraft arrived, a T Mark XVII training aircraft, in the following December and this was fitted with a nose-mounted Airborne Interception radar. The squadron primarily operated these aircraft to test the efficiency of radar units, however, as the Wellington was also capable of, and used for, long-range aerial reconnaissance, experienced aerial photographers were assigned to the squadron.

On the 30 September, 765 NAS moved to RNAS Twatt (HMS Tern), located near Twatt, Orkney, Scotland. It remained on Orkney for ten days, before relocating to RAF Hornchurch, located in the parish of Hornchurch, southeast of Romford, Essex, via RAF Eastchurch, on the Isle of Sheppey, Kent, England, arriving at Hornchurch on the 14 November, where the role of the squadron was to provide naval co-operation in liaison with No. 567 Squadron RAF, an anti-aircraft co-operation unit. However, seven months later, 765 NAS moved to RAF Manston, located in the north-east of Kent, on the Isle of Thanet, on the 14 June 1945.

Transport Squadron (1945 - 1946) 

In August, 765 NAS was repurposed as a Transport Squadron. It operated three Wellington B Mark X aircraft, however, these were equipped with troop transport type seating. On the 6 October 1945, the squadron moved to RNAS Hal Far (HMS Falcon), which was located at the southern extreme of Malta. It provided air transport for personnel, to and from different parts of the Mediterranean Basin, but primarily bringing them back to Malta for onward travel home. 765 NAS continued in this role until disbanding at Hal Far on the 23 April 1946.

Piston Engine Pilot Pool (1955 - 1957) 

765 Naval Air Squadron reformed at RNAS Culdrose (HMS Seahawk), near Helston on the Lizard Peninsula of Cornwall, England, on the 14 February 1955, as a Piston Engine Pilot Pool. The squadron was initially equipped with Firefly aircraft, specifically the T.Mk 2 and T.Mk 7 variants and also provided refresher flying for FAA pilots. In May 1955, the squadron added Oxford II, to it's aircraft inventory.

In February 1957, Sea Balliol T.Mk 21 and Sea Devon C Mk 20, were also used, however, the squadron only lasted around one month more, with 765 NAS disbanding at Culdrose on the 25 March 1957.

During its two years of existence, it converted 244 pilots to either Firefly or Oxford aircraft.

Aircraft flown

The squadron has flown a number of different aircraft types, including:
Fairey Seafox I (May 1939 - June 1942)
Fairey Swordfish I version equipped with floats (May 1939 - June 1941)
Supermarine Walrus I (May 1939 - October 1942)
Blackburn Roc equipped with floats (February 1940 - June 1941)
Vought Kingfisher I (July 1942 - October 1943)
Vickers Wellington GR Mark XI (August 1944 - October 1945)
Vickers Wellington T Mark XVII (December 1944 - October 1945)
Vickers Wellington B Mark X (July 1945 - April 1946)
Fairey Firefly T.Mk 2 (February 1955 - March 1957)
Fairey Firefly T.Mk 7 (February 1955 - November 1956)
Airspeed Oxford II (May 1955 - February 1957)
Boulton Paul Sea Balliol T.Mk 21 (February 1957 - March 1957)
de Havilland Sea Devon C Mk 20 (February 1957 - March 1957)

Naval Air Stations / Royal Air Force Stations  

765 Naval Air Squadron operated from a number of naval air stations of the Royal Navy, in Scotland and England and a number of Royal Air Force stations in England:

Commanding Officers 

List of commanding officers of 765 Naval Air Squadron with month and year of appointment and end:

1939 - 1943
Lt-Cdr H.C. Ranald, RN (May 1939-Apr 1940)
Lt-Cdr (A) H. L. McCulloch, RN (Apr 1940-Jul 1940)
Lt-Cdr (A) J.B. Wilson, RN (Jul 1940-Apr 1941)
Lt-Cdr G.R. Brown, RN (Apr 1941-Aug 1942)
Lt J.L.W.M. Allison, RN (Aug 1942-Jan 1943)
Lt-Cdr (A) L.D. Goldsmith, RNVR (Jan 1943-Oct 1943)

1944 - 1946
Lt (A) D.H. Coates, RNVR (Feb 1944-Aug 1945)
Lt (A) S.C. Abel, RNVR	(Aug 1945-Feb 1946)
Lt (A) H.E. Rumble, RNVR (Feb 1946-Apr 1946)

1955 - 1957
Lt-Cdr J.I. Baker, RN (Feb 1955-Dec 1955)
Lt-Cdr D. W. Winterton, RN (Dec 1955-Mar 1957)
Lt-Cdr W.H. Gunner, RN	(Mar 1957-Mar 1957)

Notes

References 

700 series Fleet Air Arm squadrons
Military units and formations established in 1939
Air squadrons of the Royal Navy in World War II